Cymatia americana is a species of water boatman in the family Corixidae. It is found in North America.

References

Corixidae
Articles created by Qbugbot
Insects described in 1920